Mark Randall Crawford (born May  11, 1989) is an American football defensive lineman for the Iowa Barnstormers of the Indoor Football League (IFL). He played college football at University of Kentucky and attended Ben Davis High School in Indianapolis, Indiana. He has also been a member of the Arizona Rattlers, Jacksonville Sharks, Los Angeles Kiss, San Antonio Talons and Nebraska Danger.

College career
Crawford played for the Coffeyville Community College Red Ravens in 2007 and the Kentucky Wildcats from 2008 to 2011. He was the team's starter his final two years.

Professional career

Arizona Rattlers
In 2013, Crawford was assigned to the Arizona Rattlers of the Arena Football League.

Jacksonville Sharks
On June 21, 2013, the Jacksonville Sharks claimed Crawford. Crawford played in the final 4 game for the Sharks.

Los Angeles KISS
On December 20, 2013, Crawford was selected by the Los Angeles KISS in the expansion draft.

San Antonio Talons
On February 23, 2014, Crawford and Jeremy Lewis were traded to the San Antonio Talons for Andre Jones, Joe Madsen, Jason Shirley, Darius Smith and Shawn Asiata. Crawford recorded just an assisted tackle during his time with the Talons. He was placed on recallable reassignment on March 27, 2014. Crawford appeared in two games for the Talons, including one start.

Nebraska Danger
On August 26, 2015, Crawford signed with the Nebraska Danger. He was released on February 23, 2016.

Iowa Barnstormers
On September 14, 2016, Crawford signed with the Iowa Barnstormers.

References

Living people
1989 births
Players of American football from Indiana
American football defensive linemen
Coffeyville Red Ravens football players
Kentucky Wildcats football players
Arizona Rattlers players
Jacksonville Sharks players
Los Angeles Kiss players
San Antonio Talons players
Nebraska Danger players
Iowa Barnstormers players